This is a  list of chutney musicians:

Individuals

 Ravi Bissambhar
 Ramdew Chaitoe
 Rikki Jai (1998, 1999, 2001, 2002, joint-2003 Chutney Soca Monarch)
 Sundar Popo
 Neeshan Prabhoo
 Drupatee Ramgoonai
 Heeralal "Hero" Rampartap (1997, joint-2003, 2005 Chutney Soca Monarch)
 Adesh Samaroo
 Kumari Kanchan Dinkerao Mail Shah
 Rakesh Yankaran

See also 

 List of calypso musicians
 Lists of musicians

 
Chutney